Eslem Öztürk (born 1 December 1997) is a Turkish professional footballer who plays as a midfielder for Süper Lig club İstanbulspor.

References

External links

 

Living people
1997 births
Turkish footballers
Association football midfielders
Beşiktaş J.K. footballers
Büyükşehir Belediye Erzurumspor footballers
İstanbulspor footballers
TFF First League players
TFF Second League players
People from Gölcük